The 105th United States Congress began on January 3, 1997. There were fourteen new senators (six Democrats, eight Republicans) and 72 new representatives (42 Democrats, 30 Republicans) at the start of the first session. Additionally, nine representatives (five Democrats, four Republicans) took office on various dates in order to fill vacancies during the 105th Congress before it ended on January 3, 1999.

Senate

House of Representatives

Took office January 3, 1997

Took office during the 105th Congress

See also 
List of United States senators in the 105th Congress
List of members of the United States House of Representatives in the 105th Congress by seniority

105th United States Congress
105